John W. Stovall Farm is a historic tobacco farm complex and national historic district located near Stovall, Granville County, North Carolina.  The farmhouse was built in two sections, about 1835 and about 1855–1860.  The older half is a two-story, three bay, heavy timber frame dwelling.  The newer 1 1/2-story half has a mix of Federal and Greek Revival style decorative elements.  Also on the property are the contributing corn crib, stable, smokehouse later used as a striphouse, lumber house, and a family cemetery.

It was listed on the National Register of Historic Places in 1988.

References

Tobacco buildings in the United States
Farms on the National Register of Historic Places in North Carolina
Historic districts on the National Register of Historic Places in North Carolina
Federal architecture in North Carolina
Greek Revival houses in North Carolina
Houses completed in 1835
Houses in Granville County, North Carolina
National Register of Historic Places in Granville County, North Carolina